Westhoughton High School (WHS) is an 11–16 mixed, community secondary school in Westhoughton, Greater Manchester, England.

History 
A new soundproofed music room opened at the school in 1982 as part of a £750,000 extension. In July 2010, Westhoughton High School was revealed as one of 27 schools across Greater Manchester that would no longer be rebuilt or upgraded, following the scrapping of the Building Schools for the Future (BSF) programme by the government. A new 3G all-weather pitch was constructed on an existing shale pitch at the school that was completed in May 2017, and was the first of three new pitches that was being developed as part of Bolton Council's £1.5 million capital funding. The school revised its curriculum from September 2017 to benefit from the new pitch, and be able to offer a programme of fixtures with local schools.

Demand for places and extension 
In February 2018, proposals were approved for Bolton Council to work with seven secondary schools in the Metropolitan Borough of Bolton to increase its capacity due to an increasing demand for places. A six-week public consultation started in June 2018 to increase Westhoughton High's admission number from 230 to 270 in Year Seven from September 2018, that would see the school's total capacity increase from 1,150 to 1,350. A separate consultation would be held for a building extension with a planning application submitted to the council, and concerns were raised by parents over the lack of outdoor space for current students. In August 2018, it was announced that £2.4 million would be spent on expanding the school, however due to the demand for places the school had already began to admit higher numbers. A proposal was sent to the Executive Cabinet Member for Children Services to authorise the publication of a 'statutory notice' to increase places, and if approved, the admission number increase will take place in September.

The funding was approved in August 2018 and the building extension was approved by the council's planning committee in December 2018, which involved a new two-storey classroom block being built on a field behind the school, and an existing smaller block being demolished; construction began in 2019. Councillors however warned it would not meet future demands and due to new developments in Westhoughton meant more places would need to be created.

Notable alumni 
 Maxine Peake, actress

Notable staff 
 Kristy Turner, former teacher

References

External links 
 

Westhoughton
Secondary schools in the Metropolitan Borough of Bolton
Community schools in the Metropolitan Borough of Bolton